The St. Catharines Black Hawks were a Canadian junior ice hockey team in the Ontario Hockey Association from 1962 to 1976. The team was based in St. Catharines, Ontario, Canada.

History
In 1962 the Chicago Black Hawks sponsored the financially troubled St. Catharines Teepees, and renamed the team St. Catharines Black Hawks. Chicago continued to do so until NHL sponsorship ended in 1968. From 1968 until 1972, the Hawks were owned by Fred Muller and Ken Campbell.

St. Catharines made it to the OHA finals in 1969, 1971 and 1974. They were beaten in the 1969 OHA finals by the Montreal Junior Canadiens 4 wins to 0 with 2 ties. The  Black Hawks won the J. Ross Robertson Cup in 1971 versus the Toronto Marlboros & 1974 versus the Peterborough Petes.

The 1971 Richardson Trophy series between St. Catharines and the Quebec Remparts is one of the most storied ever, featuring riots and two future Hall of Famers, Guy Lafleur and Marcel Dionne. In the 1974 Memorial Cup tournament the Black Hawks would square up against the Regina Pats and a rematch versus the Quebec Remparts.

Hap Emms bought the Black Hawks in 1972 and for the next four years attendance declined to the point that Emms refused to suffer any more losses and moved the club to Niagara Falls in 1976, rejuvenating the name of the previous Niagara Falls Flyers team which Emms had also owned.

Many blamed the poor support for the clubs on Emms’ failure to promote the team, but there were extenuating factors such as the attraction of the nearby Buffalo Sabres, expanded TV coverage of hockey and Tier II hockey in the area.

Richardson Cup 1971
The Eastern Canadian championship of 1971 was the most controversial of the series ever played for the Richardson Cup. It was also the last Eastern Canadian championship to be played before the Memorial Cup tournament began in 1972.

The series that featured future NHL stars Guy Lafleur and Marcel Dionne, never lived up to the potential on ice brilliance that could have been. Disputes off the ice and erupting violence abruped the series before it was finished.

The Black Hawks and Remparts series was intense on many levels. Besides the strong rivalry between Anglophone and Francophone hockey teams and Canadian citizens in general, there was unfinished business between Marcel Dionne and the Remparts coach Maurice Filion. Dionne had been coached by Filion in 1968 as a member of the Drummondville Rangers of the Quebec Junior Hockey League. When the Quebec Major Junior Hockey League formed in 1969, Dionne departed to play in the OHA, which was seen as a higher-calibre level of competition, to hone his skills. Filion vowed revenge against his OHA team. This rivalry was further fueled by the desire of Francophone nationalists to have a Canadian champion from a Quebec team in a Quebec-based league.

The Remparts won the first game 4-2 played in St. Catharines and televised by closed circuit to over 8,000 spectators in Quebec arenas. Despite the win, Filion complained about the referee bias against his players, calling it anti-Francophone. The Black Hawks won game 2 by a score of 8–3, to tie the series at 1 game each.

Game 3 was played in the Colisée de Québec to an overflow crowd, seeing the Remparts win 3–1. There were a total of 102 penalty minutes called, 77 of those were against the Black Hawks. Brian MacKenize of St. Catharines would be suspended for one game after confronting a linesman.

The next game of the series was uglier than the last game. Another overflow crowd saw the Remparts win game 4 by a score of 6–1. As the game wore on, more and more fights broke out on the ice, involving players leaving the penalty box to join the fray. The St. Catharines players were escorted off the ice by police amidst the hurling of debris from Quebec fans. After the game an angry mob surrounded the St. Catharines team bus on its way to the motel, and was given a police escort to safety. The mob circled the motel until the early hours of the morning.

Game 5 was played on neutral ice at Maple Leaf Gardens in Toronto, which the Black Hawks won 6–3 to narrow the series 3 games to 2 for Quebec. That was the last game played.

The parents of the St. Catharines players refused to send their children back to Quebec City for fear of the violence that occurred after game four. The Remparts refused to play anywhere else but their home rink, including any neutral ice in the province of Quebec. The problem was further confounded with threats surfacing from the FLQ (Front de libération du Québec) against St. Catharines players.

CAHA president Dawson declared the series to be over when no further compromise could be reached, and he had received official notice from St. Catharines that the team would not return to the Colisée. As a result, the Remparts went on to compete for the Memorial Cup by default, which they won, defeating the Edmonton Oil Kings.

Memorial Cup 1974
In the 1974 Memorial Cup tournament the Black Hawks would square up against the Regina Pats and a rematch versus the Quebec Remparts. St. Catharines was undefeated through the OHA playoffs to reach the Memorial Cup, eliminating the Oshawa Generals, Toronto Marlboros and Peterborough Petes in the process, with a tie against Peterborough in the finals being the only blemish on their record.

The entire cup series would be played in Calgary, Alberta at the Stampede Corral. This venue was much to the liking of St. Catharines players, who were not wanting to relive the Quebec City experience from 3 years ago. St. Catharines played a strong defensive game to open the tournament, getting some vengeance from three years ago. However, the Remparts scored 5 power play goals in the semi-final game and trounced the Black Hawks 11–3.

The Black Hawks played two more seasons in the city, but uprooted and moved to nearby Niagara Falls at the end of the 1975–76 season, becoming the second incarnation of the Niagara Falls Flyers.

Players
Two future Hockey Hall of Famers played for the St. Catharines Black Hawks. They are: two time OHA scoring champion Marcel Dionne (1968–71) and Mike Gartner in his rookie year (1975–76) before the team moved to Niagara Falls. In total 61 St. Catharines Black Hawks Alumni graduated to the NHL.

Award winners
1963–64 - Fred Stanfield, William Hanley Trophy (Humanitarian of the Year)
1964–65 - Ken Hodge, Eddie Powers Memorial Trophy (Scoring Champion)
1966–67 - Peter McDuffe, Dave Pinkney Trophy (Lowest Team GAA)
1969–70 - Marcel Dionne, Eddie Powers Memorial Trophy (Scoring Champion)
1970–71 - Marcel Dionne, Eddie Powers Memorial Trophy (Scoring Champion)
1973–74 - Dave Gorman, Jim Mahon Memorial Trophy (Top Scoring Right Winger)

NHL alumni

Yearly results
Regular season

Playoffs
1962–63 Out of playoffs.
1963–64 Defeated Oshawa Generals 8 points to 4 in quarter-finals.  Lost to Montreal Junior Canadiens 9 points to 5 in semi-finals.
1964–65 Lost to Peterborough Petes 8 points to 2 in quarter-finals.
1965–66 Lost to Oshawa Generals 8 points to 6 in quarter-finals.
1966–67 Lost to Kitchener Rangers 9 points to 3 in quarter-finals.
1967–68 Lost to Montreal Junior Canadiens 9 points to 1 in quarter-finals.
1968–69 Defeated Toronto Marlboros 8 points to 4 in quarter-finals. Defeated Niagara Falls Flyers 8 points to 6 in semi-finals. Lost to Montreal Junior Canadiens 9 points to 1 in finals.
1969–70 Defeated Kitchener Rangers 8 points to 4 in quarter-finals. Lost to Montreal Junior Canadiens 8 points to 0 in semi-finals.
1970–71 Defeated Kitchener Rangers 8 point to 0 in quarter-finals. Defeated Montreal Junior Canadiens 9 points to 5 in semi-finals. Defeated Toronto Marlboros 8 points to 0 in finals. OHA CHAMPIONS Lost to Quebec Remparts by forfeit in Richardson Trophy playoff series.
1971–72 Lost to Peterborough Petes 8 points to 2 in quarter-finals.
1972–73 Lost to Toronto Marlboros 8 points to 0 in quarter-finals.
1973–74 Defeated Oshawa Generals 9 points to 1 in quarter-finals. Defeated Toronto Marlboros 8 points to 0 in semi-finals. Defeated Peterborough Petes 9 points to 1 in finals. OHA CHAMPIONS Lost in Memorial Cup semi-final to Quebec Remparts.
1974–75 Lost to Hamilton Fincups 8 points to 0 in quarter-finals.
1975–76 Lost to Kitchener Rangers 6 points to 2 in first round.

Arena
The St. Catharines Black Hawks played in the Garden City Arena in downtown St. Catharines, Ontario from 1962 to 1976.

References

 
Defunct Ontario Hockey League teams
Sport in St. Catharines
Chicago Blackhawks minor league affiliates